Top Players' Tennis (called  in Japan and Four Players' Tennis in Europe) is a tennis video game developed by Home Data for the Nintendo Entertainment System. It was released in Japan in 1989 and North America in 1990 by Asmik and Europe in 1992 by Nintendo.

The game cover prominently features tennis champions Chris Evert and Ivan Lendl, both of whom are former number 1 ranked singles players.

Gameplay
In single-player mode, the player may compete in the four Grand Slams: the Australian Open, the French Open, Wimbledon, and the US Open. To compete in the Grand Slams, the player must first win the qualifying tournament, the Asmik Open.

With a multiplayer console accessory such as the NES Satellite or NES Four Score, Top Players' Tennis accommodates up to four simultaneous players. Singles, doubles, or mixed doubles are all available for play.

See also
 Tennis (1984)
 Jimmy Connors Tennis (1993)
 List of Family Computer games
 List of Nintendo Entertainment System games

External links
 

1989 video games
Magical Company games
Nintendo Entertainment System games
Nintendo Entertainment System-only games
Tennis video games
Video games developed in Japan
Video games set in London
Video games set in Australia
Video games set in Paris
Video games set in New York City
Melbourne in fiction
Multiplayer and single-player video games